is one of the 7 wards of the city of Kawasaki in Kanagawa Prefecture, Japan. As of 2010, the ward had an estimated population of 217,251 and a density of 11,670 persons per km². The total area was 18.61 km².

Geography
Miyamae Ward is located in eastern Kanagawa Prefecture, in the south-center portion of the city of Kawasaki, bordering on Yokohama.

Surrounding municipalities
Tama-ku, Kawasaki
Takatsu-ku, Kawasaki
Asao-ku, Kawasaki
Aoba-ku, Yokohama
Tsuzuki-ku, Yokohama

History
Archaeologists have found numerous Kofun period remains at numerous locations in what is now Miyamae-ku, indicating a long period of human settlement. Under the Nara period Ritsuryō system, it became part of Tachibana District Musashi Province. In the Edo period, it was administered as tenryō territory controlled directly by the Tokugawa shogunate, but administered through various hatamoto. Due to its proximity to Edo, it was primarily an agricultural and horticultural area supplying produce to the city. After the Meiji Restoration, the area was divided into Miyamae Village and Mukaoka Village within Tachibana District in the new Kanagawa Prefecture on April 1, 1889. These areas were annexed by the neighboring city of Kawasaki in 1938. The area became part of a huge government sponsored housing project from the 1950s and 1960s. In April 1972, the area became part of Takatsu Ward with the division of the city of Kawasaki into wards. In July 1982, Miyamae Ward was separated from Takatsu Ward.

Economy
Miyamae Ward is largely a regional commercial center and bedroom community for central Kawasaki and Tokyo.

Transportation

Rail
 Tokyu Corporation – Tōkyū Den-en-toshi Line / Tōkyū Ōimachi Line
 -  -

Road
 Tōmei Expressway
 National Route 466 (No. 3 Keihin Road, as )
 Kanagawa Prefectural Road 13
 Kanagawa Prefectural Road 45

Local attractions
Streetcar & Bus Museum

Education

St. Marianna University School of Medicine

The Kawasaki City Board of Education (川崎市育委員会) operates municipal elementary and junior high schools.

Municipal junior high schools:

 Arima (有馬中学校)
 Inukura (犬蔵中学校)
 Miyamaedaira (宮前平中学校)
 Miyazaki (宮崎中学校)
 Mukaigaoka (向丘中学校)
 Nogawa (野川中学校)
 Sugao (菅生中学校)
 Taira (平中学校)

Municipal elementary schools:

 Arima (有馬小学校)
 Fujimidai (富士見台小学校)
 Hiebara (稗原小学校)
 Inukura (犬蔵小学校)
 Minami Nogawa (南野川小学校)
 Miyamaedaira (宮前平小学校)
 Miyazaki (宮崎小学校)
 Miyazakidai (宮崎台小学校)
 Mukaigaoka (向丘小学校)
 Nishi Arima (西有馬小学校)
 Nishi Nogawa (西野川小学校)
 Nogawa (野川小学校)
 Saginuma (鷺沼小学校)
 Shirahatadai (白幡台小学校)
 Sugao (菅生小学校)
 Taira (平小学校)
 Tsuchihashi (土橋小学校)

References
Miyamae-ku Guidebook (宮前区ガイドブック), 2005. ; municipal publication

Noted people from Miyamae Ward
Becky (television personality), actress
Ao Tanaka, professional soccer player
Takayuki Morimoto, professional soccer player
Aya Kiguchi, model
Yūji Oda, actor
Tabea Nothegger, model

External links
Miyamae Ward Office
Cultural spots in Miyamae-ku

Wards of Kawasaki, Kanagawa